"Trick Me" is a song by American singer Kelis from her third studio album, Tasty (2003). It was written and produced by Dallas Austin. The song was released as the album's second single on February 17, 2004. "Trick Me" was not released in the United States as her American label, Arista, folded after the release of Tasty, and she was transferred to Jive. In Europe, she was still on the same label, Virgin.

The song received praise from critics. Internationally, "Trick Me" achieved similar chart success to that of "Milkshake". The single topped the charts in Hungary and Romania, and peaked inside the top five in the United Kingdom, New Zealand, and Australia, among other countries. It was certified platinum by the Australian Recording Industry Association (ARIA) and gold by the Recording Industry Association of New Zealand (RIANZ).

Background and release
"Trick Me" was written and produced by Dallas Austin. Recording sessions took place at DARP Studios in Atlanta, Georgia; O'Henry Studios in Burbank, California; and Chalice Studios in Hollywood, California. Background vocals and guitar were provided by Tony Reyes, and the recordings were mixed by Kevin Davis at Larabee North in North Hollywood, California.

"In Public" featuring Nas was originally chosen to be released as the second single from Tasty, but MTV News reported in late January 2004 that "Trick Me" would be released instead. "In Public" was eventually released as the fourth single in April 2005. The music video for "Trick Me" was directed by Mr. X and shot in the Toronto suburb of Scarborough on April 15, 2004. The single was not released in the United States as Kelis' label, Arista, folded just when Tasty was released in December 2003; as a result, no more singles were released there after "Milkshake". Nevertheless, "Trick Me" was sent to rhythmic contemporary and urban contemporary radio stations in the US on February 17, 2004. In Europe, however, Kelis was still on the same label, Virgin, so singles continued to be released there.

Reception

Critical response

"Trick Me" was well received by contemporary music critics. Tony Naylor of NME referred to the track as "a wonderful computer-processed reggae romp". Pitchfork reviewer Scott Plagenhoef felt that "Dallas Austin punches above his weight with 'Trick Me', on which Kelis advises to 'call the police/ There's a madwoman in town,' over a skanking, slightly echoed guitar." Blenders Joseph Patel described the song as a "crackling funk ditty", and Neil Drumming of Entertainment Weekly called it "a blistering sawtooth skank". The Independent wrote that the song's "sprightly canter" is "particularly irresistible".

Commercial performance
Despite not being released commercially in the United States, "Trick Me" managed to reach number seven on the Bubbling Under R&B/Hip-Hop Singles chart in April 2004. The song debuted at number two on the UK Singles Chart behind Frankee's "F.U.R.B. (Fuck You Right Back)", earning Kelis her second consecutive top-five entry. "Trick Me" debuted on the Irish Singles Chart at number eight for the week ending May 27, 2004, the week's highest debut. It peaked at number four two weeks later.

"Trick Me" found similar success in continental Europe, outpeaking "Milkshake" in Austria, Belgium, France, Germany, Italy, the Netherlands, and Switzerland—although "Trick Me" peaked at number five on the European Hot 100 Singles, while "Milkshake" reached number three. The single also reached number one in Hungary and Romania, the top five in Norway, and the top 10 in Denmark. Additionally, "Trick Me" has become Kelis' highest-peaking solo single in Germany, France, Italy, and Switzerland.

The single debuted and peaked at number five on the ARIA Singles Chart for four non-consecutive weeks, becoming Kelis' second top-five single in Australia. The Australian Recording Industry Association (ARIA) certified it platinum, denoting shipments in excess of 70,000 copies. In New Zealand, "Trick Me" debuted at number seven on the RIANZ Singles Chart, before peaking at number three in July 2004, tying with "Milkshake" as Kelis' highest-peaking single on the chart. The track was certified gold by the Recording Industry Association of New Zealand (RIANZ) the following month for sales of 7,500 copies.

Track listings

UK CD 1 and German CD single
"Trick Me" (album version) – 3:26
"Milkshake" (remix) (featuring Pharrell and Pusha T from Clipse) – 4:45

UK CD 2, Australian CD single, and digital EP
"Trick Me" (album version) – 3:26
"Trick Me" (Mac & Toolz Extended Remix) – 4:31
"Trick Me" (Artificial Intelligence Remix) – 5:54
"Trick Me" (Adam Freeland Remix) – 7:27
"Trick Me" (E-Smoove House Trick) – 7:42

UK 12-inch single
A1. "Trick Me" (album version) – 3:26
A2. "Trick Me" (Mac & Toolz Extended Remix) – 4:31
B1. "Trick Me" (Artificial Intelligence Remix) – 5:54
B1. "Trick Me" (Adam Freeland Remix) – 7:27

Digital single
"Trick Me" – 3:26

Credits and personnel
Credits adapted from the liner notes of Tasty.

Recording
 Recorded at DARP Studios (Atlanta, Georgia), O'Henry Studios (Burbank, California), and Chalice Studios (Hollywood, California)
 Mixed at Larabee North (North Hollywood, California)
 Mastered at Sterling Sound (New York City)

Personnel

 Kelis – vocals
 Dallas Austin – production, arrangement
 Rick Sheppard – recording
 Carlton Lynn – recording
 Doug Harms – recording assistance
 Cesar Guevara – recording assistance
 Kevin "KD" Davis – mixing
 Tony Reyes – guitar, background vocals
 Greg "Ruckus" Andrews – DJ
 Chris Athens – mastering

Charts

Weekly charts

Year-end charts

Certifications

Release history

See also
 List of Romanian Top 100 number ones of the 2000s

References

2003 songs
2004 singles
American reggae songs
Arista Records singles
Funk songs
Kelis songs
Music videos directed by Director X
Music videos shot in Toronto
Number-one singles in the Czech Republic
Number-one singles in Hungary
Number-one singles in Romania
Ska songs
Song recordings produced by Dallas Austin
Songs written by Dallas Austin
Virgin Records singles